The 2007 tuberculosis scare occurred when Atlanta personal-injury lawyer Andrew "Drew" Speaker flew from Atlanta, Georgia to Paris, France and on to Greece and then Italy before returning on a flight from Prague, Czech Republic to Montreal, Canada, where he crossed over the border and back into the United States while infected with multi-drug-resistant tuberculosis. The Centers for Disease Control and Prevention believed at the time that Speaker was suffering from extensively drug-resistant tuberculosis (XDR-TB), but failed to inform Speaker of this worsened sickness before his travels abroad. The incident sparked a debate in Congress on the failure of federal customs agents to stop him. Upon Speaker's return to the United States, the CDC placed him under involuntary isolation (similar to quarantine) using a provision of the Public Health Service Act. With this action, Speaker became the first individual subjected to a CDC isolation order since 1963.

Background
In January 2007, Speaker suffered a fall and went to the doctor, concerned that he had bruised a rib. Doctors X-rayed his chest and found an abnormality that required further testing. Andrew Speaker was suspected of having TB when a positive PPD test came back on March 2, 2007. His third CT scan was done on March 3 2007 and a bronchoscopy was done on March 8 2007. After 18 days of incubation the isolate was sent to CDC for confirmation of his susceptibility results that were done by the Georgia Department of Human Resources (DHR).

On March 28, 2007 his doctors and the health department believed the TB strain Speaker had was a resistant one and communicated this to the CDC. On May 1 the apparent MDR TB infection was discussed with the CDC lab by his doctors and they discussed discontinuing the treatment he was on at that time. On May 9 the suspicion of MDR TB was confirmed. A meeting was held with Fulton County Health Officials, his doctors, his fiancée and his father and father-in-law on May 10, 2007. At this time he was told that he was not contagious and not a threat to anyone but that he would need to go to Denver for treatment. It would take a few weeks to arrange this. He was advised, or according to some accounts strongly recommended, not to travel.

Travel sequence
On May 12, 2007, Speaker flew from the U.S. to Paris. On May 14, he flew on to Athens and, two days later, flew to the Aegean holiday island of Santorini for his wedding. Speaker then flew to Rome for his honeymoon.

Doctors say that only after Speaker left the United States did they realize he likely had XDR-TB. Speaker says that he was informed of MDR TB before leaving the country, and that while officials preferred him not to fly, they said that he was not a threat and was not required to wear a mask. Once Speaker was in Europe, however, test results showed his strain of tuberculosis was even rarer than originally thought, leading public health officials to try to persuade Speaker to turn himself in to Italian health authorities. The CDC informed him that there were no options for the CDC to get him home, and that he would have to arrange private transportation. Speaker instead flew by commercial jet to Prague and then on to Montréal. Both Speaker and his new wife claimed that, had they been offered transport, they would have accepted it and would have waited in Rome. Speaker has also said that the CDC told him they were going to send officials to put him in Italian quarantine for up to two years, and that he was not told special transportation was arranged.

Once in Montréal, Speaker rented a car and drove across the Canada–United States border. A Customs and Border Protection Officer failed to detain him at the frontier, disregarding a warning after he had passed Speaker's passport through the Treasury Enforcement Communications System (TECS) to hold the traveler, wear a protective mask when dealing with him, and call health authorities because he "did not look sick".

Flight itinerary
According to the CDC, Speaker flew on the following flights:

Tuberculosis case notes
On May 31, 2007, Speaker was moved from Grady Memorial Hospital in Atlanta to the National Jewish Medical and Research Center in Denver, Colorado, for further treatment.

It was reported that Speaker's father-in-law, Robert C. Cooksey, works for the Centers for Disease Control and Prevention and is a microbiologist who has conducted research on tuberculosis, according to his CDC biography posted on the agency's Web site.

Wearing a medical mask, Speaker was interviewed by Diane Sawyer on the June 1 edition of the American talk show Good Morning America on ABC and apologized to all passengers, explaining that he had not intended to endanger them.

According to an interview on Larry King Live, Speaker said that he had not been told that there was any risk of transmitting the disease to others, nor did the May 10 letter recommending against his travel state this, which Speaker in any case had not received before leaving May 14. His wife, with whom he lived for five months without precautions, remained uninfected.

New diagnosis
On July 4, 2007 the National Jewish Medical and Research Center announced, and the CDC confirmed, that Mr. Speaker's earlier diagnosis was incorrect and that he instead had multi-drug-resistant tuberculosis (MDR-TB), a more treatable form of tuberculosis.

Isolation and law
Before a Congressional hearing, Speaker and his father played audio recordings from CDC and Fulton County health officials which say he was not a danger to others. He asked such questions on five recordings repeatedly and was given the same answers even after stating on two recordings that he was going out of the country and the CDC later admitted they were aware and waited until he had already left before taking further actions.

Speaker was in New York when the CDC served him with an isolation order but CDC director Julie Gerberding stated that the government was legally constrained prior to that order. The federal statute granting quarantine authority allows isolation or quarantine but only for individuals coming into the country from a foreign country or territory.

Georgia TB law may have required Speaker to be confined for two weeks and only allowed travel for medical appointments. A court confinement order can isolate a patient only after the infected patient ignores medical advice. This method can be overridden by a declaration of public health emergency by the governor of Georgia.

In 2007, seven Canadians and two Czechs sued Speaker in Montreal Superior Court; eight of the plaintiffs were on the same flight as Andrew Speaker and one was related to one of the passengers.

See also
 Progress of the SARS outbreak for a comparison to another news-worthy international quarantining incident, 2002-2004

References

External links
 Interview with Andrew Speaker
 Official transcript of CDC briefing session on the Speaker case

Tuberculosis
Health disasters in the United States
Tuberculosis Scare, 2007
2007 health disasters
Scares